Linder Sterling (born 1954, Liverpool), commonly known as Linder, is a British artist known for her photography, radical feminist photomontage and confrontational performance art. She was also the former front-woman of Manchester based post-punk group Ludus. In 2017, Sterling was honored with the Paul Hamlyn Foundation Award.

For her solo shows at the Hepworth Wakefield and Tate St Ives in 2013, Sterling collaborated with choreographer Kenneth Tindall of Northern Ballet for a performance piece, The Ultimate Form (2013), inspired by the artist's research into the work of Barbara Hepworth.

Recent solo exhibitions include Nottingham Contemporary, Kestnergesellschaft, Musée d'Art Moderne de Paris, and Museum of Modern Art PS1, and Sterling's work has been included in group exhibitions at Tate Modern, Australian Centre for Contemporary Art, Tate Britain, and Museum of Contemporary Art, Chicago.

Early life and education
Sterling was born in Manchester to the late Jean and Thomas Mulvey. She was educated at Upholland Grammar School and studied Graphic Design at Manchester Polytechnic from 1974 to 1977.

Work and exhibitions

Sterling's photomontage work was influenced by the punk rock movement; the punk cut-and-paste sensibility provided a vehicle to explore rebellious, gender, commodity critique, and the body. Her collage work was also influenced by the art historical Dadaist heritage, in particular the work of the German artist Hannah Hoch).

In one of her early works, the cover art for the 1977 single release of "Orgasm Addict" by the punk band the Buzzcocks, the collage depicts a naked woman with an iron for a head and grinning mouths instead of nipples. "At this point, men's magazines were either DIY, cars or porn. Women's magazines were fashion or domestic stuff. So, guess the common denominator – the female body. I took the female form from both sets of magazines and made these peculiar jigsaws highlighting these various cultural monstrosities that I felt there were at the time."

Sterling's work has been the subject of numerous international solo exhibitions, including those at the Tate Museum St. Ives, Nottingham Contemporary, Musée d'Art Moderne de Paris, MoMA/P.S.1, Kestnergesellschaft, among others. Her work has been featured in group shows at the Tate Modern, Tate Britain, the Museum of Contemporary Art, Chicago, Australian Centre for Contemporary Art, among other venues.

Sterling's work is represented by Stuart Shave/Modern Art, London and Blum & Poe, Los Angeles.

Public art
In 2018, Sterling was commissioned by Art on the Underground to produce a public art work at Southwark station. The Bower of Bliss, her first large-scale public art piece in London, consisted of an 85-metre long street-level photomontage billboard and a cover commission for the 29th edition of the pocket Tube map. Its launch was marked with a performance art piece in November 2018.

Performance art 
 The Bower of Bliss, Southwark Underground Station, London, November 2018 for Art on the Underground
 Destination Moon. You must not look at her!, Duke of York Steps, London, 2016
 Donkey Skin, Art Night, Institute of Contemporary Arts, London, 2016
 Children of the Mantic Stain, Leeds Art Gallery, 2015
 The Ultimate Form, Salle Matisse, Musée d'art moderne de la ville de Paris, 2013
 The Darktown Cakewalk: Celebrated from the House of FAME, produced by Sorcha Dallas for the Glasgow International Festival of Visual Art, Glasgow, 2010
 The Darktown Cakewalk: Celebrated from the House of FAME, Chisenhale Gallery, London, 2010
 The Working Class Goes To Paradise, Tate Triennial, Tate Britain, London, 2006
 Ludus, Hacienda, Manchester, 1982

Ludus (band)

In 1978, Sterling co-founded the post-punk band Ludus, she performed as its singer and front-woman until the band split-up in 1983. She designed many of the group's album covers and sleeves. Ludus' music ranged from post punk to experimental avantgarde jazz to cocktail jazz. Sterling's distinctive vocal quality and techniques (including screaming, unusual sounds and laughter) combined with her lyrics, focused on female desire, alienation, sexual politics and gender roles. The bulk of the band's material was originally released on the indy labels such as  New Hormones and Crepuscule.

Publications
 Linder''']', published by Ridinghouse 2015
 [http://apracticeforeverydaylife.com/projects/linder-femme-objet Femme/Objet'', published by Musée d'Art moderne de la ville de Paris, 2013, on the occasion of Linder's solo exhibition
 Linder: Works 1976–2006, (with essays written by Jon Savage, Philip Hoare, Lynne Tillman, Paul Bayley, Andrew Renton and Morrissey), published by JRP|Editions, 2006

Collections
Sterling's work is included in the permanent collection of the Tate Modern Museum, the Museum of Modern Art, among others.

Honours and awards
In 2005 Sterling receive a grant from the Arts Council of England. In 2017, Sterling received the Paul Hamlyn Foundation Award for her creative work. In 2018, she was named the first Artist-in-Residence at Chatsworth House in Derbyshire. Her work during the residency was inspired by the Act of Representation of the People, the which gave women over the age of thiry the right to vote.

Personal life
Sterling has a son, Maxwell Sterling. She lives and works in London.

Sterling is a long time friend of The Smiths lead singer, Morrissey, since they met at a Sex Pistols sound check in Manchester in 1976. Sterling was the inspiration for The Smiths' critically acclaimed song "Cemetry Gates."

References

Bibliography

Further reading
 An interview with artist Linder Sterling, by Sue Herdman, The Arts Society 26 March 2018
  Modernart.net
  Ludus
 Sorcha Dallas Sorchadallas
  3am magazine
  Wire-sound.com

1954 births
Living people
Photographers from Manchester
Musicians from Manchester
People educated at Upholland Grammar School
Alumni of Manchester Metropolitan University
English contemporary artists
English feminists
Women punk rock singers
20th-century women artists
21st-century women artists
English women musicians
Artists from Liverpool